The National Film Awards is an annual awards ceremony held annually in Dhaka, Bangladesh. It is considered to be the most prominent film award ceremony in Bangladesh. The National Film Awards were established in 1975 by the government of Bangladesh. Every year, a national panel appointed by the government selects the winning entries.

History 
The National Film Awards were first presented in 1975. The government of Bangladesh offers the National Film Awards to the films and individuals for notable contributions to the art of cinema. Beginning in 1975, The National Film Awards is an event that takes place annually that includes colorful programs, dance, and music. The awards are the only film awards awarded by the government of Bangladesh.

No awards were given in 1981 because the panel determined that no film was competent enough to receive an award.

Juries and rules 
The juries are appointed by the Bangladesh Film Censor Board, a department under the Ministry of Information of the government of Bangladesh. The board members are chosen from a variety of professions; it has previously included social workers, government officers, educators, journalists, filmmakers, film producers, actors, and poets. The board also provides secretarial assistance and manages screenings of films submitted for the National Film Award. It is also responsible for screening of films examined by the Appellate Committee.

Award categories 
Every award winner receives a trophy in addition to cash and a certificate. The Lifetime Achievement Award was first introduced in 2009. The amount of cash is increasing than that of the starting time. For Lifetime Achievement it is Tk 300,000, best producer and director Tk 200,000 each, and others Tk 100,000 from November 2019.

Lifetime Achievement Award
 National Film Award for Lifetime Achievement

Merit Awards

 Best Film
 Best Short Film
 Best Director
 Best Actor
 Best Actress
 Best Supporting Actor
 Best Supporting Actress
 Best Performance in a Negative Role
 Best Performance in a Comic Role
 Best Child Artist
 Best Music Director
 Best Music Composer
 Best Male Playback Singer
 Best Female Playback Singer
 Best Choreography
 Best Lyrics

Technical Awards

 Best Story
 Best Screenplay
 Best Dialogue
 Best Cinematography
 Best Editing
 Best Art Direction
 Best Sound Recording
 Best Costume Design 
 Best Make-up
 Best Special Effects

Special awards
 Special Jury Award
 Best Feature Film

Awards by decade
 National Film Awards (1975–1980): 1975  • 1976  • 1977  • 1978  • 1979  • 1980 
 National Film Awards (1982–1990): 1982  • 1983  • 1984  • 1985  • 1986  • 1987  • 1988  • 1989  • 1990 
 National Film Awards (1991–2000): 1991  • 1992  • 1993  • 1994  • 1995  • 1996  • 1997  • 1998  • 1999  • 2000 
 National Film Awards (2001–2010): 2001  • 2002  • 2003  • 2004  • 2005  • 2006  • 2007  • 2008  • 2009  • 2010 
 National Film Awards (2011–2020): 2011  • 2012  • 2013  • 2014  • 2015  • 2016  • 2017  • 2018  • 2019  • 2020 
 National Film Awards (2021): 2021

See also
Bachsas Awards
Meril Prothom Alo Awards
Babisas Award

References

 
1975 establishments in Bangladesh
Awards established in 1975
Bangladeshi film awards
Civil awards and decorations of Bangladesh